Billing Aquadrome is a leisure park in Great Billing, a district of eastern Northampton, England. Facilities within the  park, which was built around various mature gravel pits, include a caravan site, marina and funfair. It is also frequently home to a wide variety of shows throughout the year, including music events and car shows such as Vauxfest.

At the edge of the park is Billing Mill, a family pub, which is housed in a converted water-mill.

Railway 
The aquadrome has had a variety of railway attractions over its lifetime. In April 1949, a new miniature railway was opened, featuring a model of a Royal Scot locomotive.

References

External links
 

Sports venues in Northampton
Tourist attractions in Northamptonshire
Parks and open spaces in Northamptonshire